Dryope is a genus of flies from the family Dryomyzidae. There are 3 known species.

Species
D. decrepita (Zetterstedt, 1838) 
D. flaveola (Fabricius, 1794) 
D. melanderi (Steyskal, 1957)

References

Dryomyzidae
Articles containing video clips
Sciomyzoidea genera